Thomas Kevin Fagan (born February 25, 1943) is Professor and Director of the School MA/EdS Program in the Department of Psychology at the University of Memphis.

References 

1943 births
Living people
21st-century American psychologists
Kent State University alumni
People from Warren, Ohio
University of Memphis faculty
20th-century American psychologists